Frith is a surname. Notable people with the surname include:

 Benjamin Frith (b.1957), British pianist
 Billy Frith (1912–1996), English football club manager
 Clifford Frith (artist), Australian artist, co-founder of the Experimental Art Foundation in Adelaide in 1974
 Clifford Brodie Frith (b.1949), Australian ornithologist
 Chris Frith (b.1942), British psychologist
 David Frith (b.1937), British cricket writer
 Dawn Whyatt Frith, Australian ornithologist
 Doug Frith (1945–2009), Canadian politician
 Francis Frith (1822–1898), British photographer
 Fred Frith (b.1949), British musician
 Freddie Frith (1909–1988), British Grand Prix motorcycle road racing World Champion
 Harold James Frith (1921–1982), Australian ornithologist
 Heather Frith (b.1967), Bermudian singer-songwriter and poet Heather Nova
 Hezekiah Frith (1763–1848), Bermudian, "Gentleman" Privateer and British Ship Owner, engaged in Piracy in the 1790s
 James Frith (b.1977), British politician
 John Frith (disambiguation)
 Mark Frith (b.1970), British journalist
 Mary Frith (1584–1659), English pickpocket
 Michael K. Frith (b.1941), British artist and television producer
 Royce Frith (1923–2005), Canadian diplomat and politician
 Simon Frith (b.1946), British musicologist
 Uta Frith (b.1941), British developmental psychologist
 Walter Frith (1856–1941), English dramatist and novelist
 William Frith (disambiguation)

See also
Frith
Firth (surname)

English-language surnames